Night of the Ninja is a role-playing game published by IIE Games Corporation (Canada) in 1986.

Description
Night of the Ninja is a modern system of oriental martial arts. The simple rules cover character creation, skills, weapons, running the games, etc., but the main emphasis is on combat, featuring unusual weapons such as scythes, whips, spikes, and blowpipes.

Publication history
Night of the Ninja was designed by Tom Wall and Sandford Tuey and published by IIE Games Corporation in 1986 as a 54-page book.

Reviews
White Wolf #8 (Dec./Jan., 1987)

References

Canadian role-playing games
Espionage role-playing games
Martial arts role-playing games
Role-playing games introduced in 1986